Maurice Herbert Donahue (May 10, 1864 – September 10, 1928) was the 75th Justice of the Ohio Supreme Court and a United States circuit judge of the United States Court of Appeals for the Sixth Circuit.

Education and career

Born on May 10, 1864, in Monroe, Ohio, Donahue read law in 1885. He entered private practice in New Lexington, Ohio from 1885 to 1900. He was prosecutor for Perry County, Ohio from 1887 to 1903. He was a Judge of the Circuit Court of Ohio for the Fifth Judicial Circuit from 1900 to 1910, serving as Chief Judge from 1908 to 1910. He was elected as a Democrat on November 8, 1910 and reelected in 1916, as the 75th Associate Justice of the Supreme Court of Ohio, serving from January 1, 1911, to November 11, 1919.

Federal judicial service

Donahue was nominated by President Woodrow Wilson on October 1, 1919, to a seat on the United States Court of Appeals for the Sixth Circuit vacated by Judge John Wesley Warrington. He was confirmed by the United States Senate on October 29, 1919, and received his commission the same day. He took the oath of office and commenced service on November 13, 1919. His service terminated on September 10, 1928, due to his death.

Family

Donahue married Martina Johnson of Perry County on September 10, 1889. They had two daughters.

Death

Donahue began suffering from heart disease in 1927, and worked until June 1928. He was confined to his home in Bexley, Ohio until his death there on his 39th wedding anniversary on September 10, 1928. He was buried at New Lexington Cemetery in New Lexington.

Portrait

A portrait of Donahue presented by his family in December 1928 hangs in Courtroom 507 of the Potter Stewart United States Courthouse.

References

Sources
 
 

1864 births
1928 deaths
Judges of the United States Court of Appeals for the Sixth Circuit
United States court of appeals judges appointed by Woodrow Wilson
20th-century American judges
People from New Lexington, Ohio
Justices of the Ohio Supreme Court
Ohio Democrats
County district attorneys in Ohio
United States federal judges admitted to the practice of law by reading law
People from Monroe, Ohio
People from Bexley, Ohio